Admiralty Staff could refer to:

Admiralty Naval Staff (1917-1964)
German Imperial Admiralty Staff (1899-1918)